Arthur Sidney Siegel (August 2, 1913, Detroit – February 1, 1978, Chicago) was an American photographer and educator.

Biography 
Siegel began photographing in the mid-1920s as a youth. He studied at University of Michigan, and graduated with a degree in sociology at Wayne State University in 1937 and then enrolled in the New Bauhaus at the Armour Institute. There he studied under the school's founder, László Moholy-Nagy, as well as György Kepes, until 1938, when he returned to Detroit.  He then began working as a photojournalist for the New York Times, and took journalism assignments for newspapers, magazines, and government agencies for the next several decades. During World War II he photographed for the U.S. Army Air Corps and the Office of War Information.

After the war, he returned to the New Bauhaus (by then the IIT Institute of Design) as an instructor, at the request of Moholy-Nagy. He eventually became head of the school's photography department. He left in 1955 to work in photojournalism full-time, and returned in 1965; in 1971, he was named president of the IIT Institute of Design. In 1955, he married Irene Yarovich, an artist whom he met at IIT.

Siegel's photography was included in several major exhibitions at art galleries, including two shows devoted exclusively to Siegel at the Art Institute of Chicago and as part of the "Image of America" exhibit at the Museum of Modern Art. He was noted for his use of experimental color techniques, and from the 1950s often explored abstract use of color as a vehicle for expression. He worked with light in novel ways by "introduc[ing] creative methods of back-lighting and projecting light onto surfaces". He also wrote extensively on photography and influenced the development of photographic education programs.

References

1913 births
1978 deaths
20th-century American photographers
American photojournalists
Artists from Detroit
20th-century American Jews
Wayne State University alumni
Illinois Institute of Technology faculty
Military personnel from Detroit
Photographers from Michigan
People of the United States Office of War Information
University of Michigan alumni